Bogbutton is a common name for several plants and may refer to:

Eriocaulon
Lachnocaulon
Sclerolepis